Campanini is an Italian surname. People with the surname include:

 Barbara Campanini (1721–1799) Italian ballerina
 Carlo Campanini (1906–1984), Italian actor, singer and comedian
 Cleofonte Campanini (1860–1919) Italian conductor
 Italo Campanini (1845–1896), Italian operatic tenor, brother of Cleofonte

See also

Casa Campanini, a building in Milan, Italy

Surnames
Italian-language surnames